Tangeh Bolāghi, also transliterated as Tange-ye Bolāghi, or Bolāghi Gorge, is an archaeologically significant valley consisting of 130 ancient settlements, dating back to the period between 5000 BCE and the Sassanian dynastic era (224-651 CE). It is situated in Iran’s southern province of Fars, some 7 kilometres from Pasargadae, Iran. This is the valley of the Polvar River, a tributary to Kor River.

Archaeological research since 2005 have discovered a section of the Royal Road (Rāh-e Shāhi — راه شاهی) connecting Pasargadae to Persepolis, Susa and other regions of the Persian Empire up to Sardis. Excavations have provided archaeologists with a unique insight into the lives of the people living in the Achaemenid dynastic era.

Archaeology
Prior to Sivand Dam being completed in 2007, rescue archaeology was conducted in the area.

In May 2005, archaeologists unearthed a complete human skeleton at one of the excavation sites, thought to date back to the Sassanid era (224-651). The skeleton, found in a squatting position, is of an adult man. An earthenware item was also found at this site which is considered to be the largest ancient earthenware of its kind ever found in Iran. In April 2006 this find was overshadowed by the discovery of the 7000-years old skeleton of a young woman dating from the Tell-i Bakun Era (the fifth and fourth millennia BC) by a joint Iranian-German team of archaeologists in the same area. The archaeologists further found eight stone beads with the skeleton close to her wrists and neck. "The girl was buried while sleeping on her side and bending her legs with arms under her head like the sleep position of most children", according to the head of the team.

When the Sivand Dam came into full service in 2007, part of an ancient site including the Achaemenid Shah's Road between Cyrus's tomb and Pasargadae, 130 ancient settlements and a palace ascribed to Darius the Great may have been immersed in water from the rising Polvar River. Yet some reports indicated that there was not enough water flow in the river to fill up the dam completely.

Gallery

See also
Sivand Dam
Pasargadae
Cyrus the Great

Notes and references

External links
 Pasargadae World Heritage Site, Pasargadae official website.  Nota bene: This domain name seems to have been sold to a commercial company and therefore does not represent the original site.
 Cultural Heritage News Agency (CHN). (Khabar-gozāri-e Mirās-e Farhangi - خبرگزاری میراث فرهنگی).
 CHN, Archaeological excavations in Bolaghi Gorge — 8 Images (with English captions).
 CHN, Archaeological excavations in Bolaghi Gorge — 8 Images (with Persian captions).
 CHN, 26 April 2006, Disturbing a 7000-Year-Old Girl’s Nap in Bolaghi Gorge.
 CHN, 30 April 2006, 7000-Year-Old Mass Grave Discovered in Bolaghi Gorge.
 CHN, 15 May 2006, Palace of Darius the Great Discovered in Bolaghi Gorge.
 CHN, 27 June 2006, 5000-Year-Old Settlement Areas Found in Bolaghi Gorge.
 CHN, 13 August 2006, Life Goes Back to 10000 Years Ago in Bolaghi Gorge.
 CHN, 30 September 2006, Looking for the Extent of Wine Production in Bolaghi Gorge.
 CHN, 24 February 2007, Palace of Darius the Great to be Unearthed in Bolaghi Gorge.
 CHN, 5 March 2007, Eastern Porch of Darius’ Palace Discovered in Bolaghi Gorge.
 CHN, 14 March 2007, Wine Production Structures in Bolaghi Gorge are in Danger.
 CHN, 19 March 2007, Eyes of Achaemenid Statues Found in Bolaghi Gorge.
 CHN, 12 April 2007, Initial Measures for Sivand Inundation Started.
 CHN, 21 July 2007, Darius Palace in Bolaghi Gorge to be Restored.
 International Committee to Save the Archaeological Sites of Pasargad: English, Persian.
 Mohammad Sālehi-Zādeh and Negār Sālehi-Zādeh, directors and producers, The last screams of Bolāghi Gorge and Pasargadae Plains ("Ākharin Faryād'ha'ye Tang-e ye Bolāghi va Dasht-e Pāsār'gād"), dedicated to International Committee to Save the Archaeological Sites of Pasargad, YouTube.
 Persepolis, Encyclopædia Britannica On-line. 
 Pasargad, Bam registered in World Heritage list, Payvand, January 7, 2005. 
Heritage of the forgotten empire . (This is a link to a commercial Air travelling company - may be removed.)
Sivand
 Deutsches Archäologisches Institut (German Archaeological Institute), Iran: Darre-ye Bolāghi (in English).
 Kamyar Abdi, Sensationalism vs. Rationalism. The Sivand Dam: political sensationalism  vs. archaeological rationalism,  September 12, 2005, Iranian.com.
 Ali Mousavi, Cyrus can rest in peace. Pasargadae and rumors about the dangers of Sivand Dam, September 16, 2005, Iranian.com.

Archaeological sites in Iran
Architecture in Iran
Geography of Fars Province